John J. Hafer (1932–2019) represented District 1 in the Maryland Senate, which covers Garrett, Allegany, and Washington Counties. He retired from office in 2007.

Education
Hafer attended Wharton School at the University of Pennsylvania and received his B.S. (economics), graduating in 1954. He later graduated from the Pittsburgh Institute of Mortuary Science in 1958.

Career
Hafer was a medic in the U.S. Army and also was a funeral director.

Hafer was a member of the Maryland Farm Bureau, the Allegany County Farm Bureau, and the Cumberland Chamber of Commerce. He was also a member of Mason Lodge, Scottish Rite 32nd degree, Tall Cedar of Lebanon, Past Potentate, Ali Ghan Shrine Temple, and is a Past Grand Tall Cedar. He is also a member of the Fraternal Order of Police, Farrady American Legion Post, Cumberland B.P.O. Elks; Cumberland Moose. Past chair, Salvation Army and the American Cancer Crusade.

Election results
2002 Race for Maryland State Senate – District 1
{| class="wikitable"
|-
!Name
!Votes
!Percent
!Outcome
|-
|-
|John J. Hafer, Rep.
|29,602
|  99.4%
|   Won
|-
|Other Write-Ins
|180
|  0.6%
|   Lost
|}

1998 Race for Maryland State Senate – District 1
{| class="wikitable"
|-
!Name
!Votes
!Percent
!Outcome
|-
|-
|John J. Hafer, Rep.
|20,552
|  100%
|   Won
|}

1994 Race for Maryland State Senate – District 1
{| class="wikitable"
|-
!Name
!Votes
!Percent
!Outcome
|-
|-
|John J. Hafer, Rep.
|20,496
|  71%
|   Won
|-
|-
|Edward A. Malloy Jr., Dem.
|8,209
|  29%
|   Lost
|}

1990 Race for Maryland State Senate – District 1
{| class="wikitable"
|-
!Name
!Votes
!Percent
!Outcome
|-
|-
|John J. Hafer, Rep.
|14,397
|  59%
|   Won
|-
|-
|Daniel F. McMullen, Dem.
|10,126
|  41%
|   Lost
|}

References

External links
 http://www.msa.md.gov/msa/mdmanual/05sen/former/html/msa12148.html

1932 births
2019 deaths
Republican Party Maryland state senators
People from Frostburg, Maryland
Wharton School of the University of Pennsylvania alumni
American funeral directors
21st-century American politicians